Fulton is a town in Clarke County, Alabama, United States. At the 2020 census, the population was 223.

Geography
Fulton is located at 31°47'25.642" North, 87°43'58.544" West (31.790456, -87.732929).

Demographics

At the 2000 census there were 308 people, 122 households, and 87 families in the town. The racial makeup of the town was 82.14% White and 17.86% Black or African American.
Of the 122 households 38.5% had children under the age of 18 living with them, 59.0% were married couples living together, 9.8% had a female householder with no husband present, and 27.9% were non-families. 27.0% of households were one person and 18.0% were one person aged 65 or older. The average household size was 2.52 and the average family size was 3.07.

The age distribution was 28.2% under the age of 18, 8.8% from 18 to 24, 27.6% from 25 to 44, 18.8% from 45 to 64, and 16.6% 65 or older. The median age was 34 years. For every 100 females, there were 91.3 males. For every 100 females age 18 and over, there were 84.2 males.

The median household income was $23,750 and the median family income  was $33,500. Males had a median income of $29,107 versus $15,417 for females. The per capita income for the town was $12,602. About 11.8% of families and 17.8% of the population were below the poverty line, including 22.9% of those under the age of eighteen and 16.7% of those sixty five or over.

Notable person
 Grey Clarke, former Major League Baseball player

References 

Towns in Clarke County, Alabama
Towns in Alabama